Anthidium sanguinicaudum is a species of bee in the family Megachilidae.

Distribution
Brazil
Colombia
French Guiana
Suriname
Venezuela

References

sanguinicaudum
Fauna of French Guiana
Insects of South America
Insects described in 1933